The Airdrome Fokker DR-1 is an American amateur-built aircraft, designed and produced by Airdrome Aeroplanes, of Holden, Missouri. The aircraft is supplied as a kit for amateur construction and is available in two versions, a full-sized and a 3/4 scale replica.

The aircraft is a replica of the First World War German Fokker Dr.I Triplane, built from modern materials and powered with modern engines.

Design and development
The Airdrome Fokker DR-1 features a strut-braced triplane layout, a single-seat open cockpit, fixed conventional landing gear and a single engine in tractor configuration.

The aircraft is made from bolted-together aluminum tubing, with its flying surfaces covered in doped aircraft fabric. Both aircraft kits are made up of twelve sub-kits. The dimensions and the engines recommended vary depending on which variant is being constructed. Building time for either version is estimated at 400 hours by the manufacturer.

Variants
Airdrome Fokker DR-1 Triplane - Full Scale Replica
Five had been completed by the end of 2011.
Airdrome Fokker DR-1 Triplane - 3/4 Scale Replica
Twenty-seven had been completed by the end of 2011.

Specifications (3/4 scale DR-1)

References

External links

Homebuilt aircraft
Single-engined tractor aircraft
Replica aircraft